Patrik Sundberg (born 9 December 1975) is a Swedish freestyle skier. He competed at the 1998 Winter Olympics and the 2002 Winter Olympics.

References

External links
 

1975 births
Living people
Swedish male freestyle skiers
Olympic freestyle skiers of Sweden
Freestyle skiers at the 1998 Winter Olympics
Freestyle skiers at the 2002 Winter Olympics
People from Österåker Municipality
Sportspeople from Stockholm County